The 1975 Berlin Marathon, known as the Berlin Volksmarathon, was the second running of the annual marathon race held in Berlin, West Germany, held on 28 September. A West German husband and wife duo won the races, with Ralf Bochröder taking the men's race in 2:47:08 hours and Kristin Bochröder the women's race in 3:59:15. A total of 236 runners finished the race, comprising 232 men and 4 women.

Results

Men

Women

References 

 Results. Association of Road Racing Statisticians. Retrieved 2020-06-24.
 Berlin Marathon results archive. Berlin Marathon. Retrieved 2020-06-24.

External links 
 Official website

1975
Berlin Marathon
1970s in West Berlin
Berlin Marathon
Berlin Marathon